The 2003–04 National Division Three South was the fourth season (17th overall) of the fourth division (south) of the English domestic rugby union competition using the name National Division Three South.  New teams to the division included Launceston who were relegated from the 2002–03 National Division Two while promoted clubs included Southend (champions) and Haywards Heath (playoffs) coming up from London Division 1 and Dings Crusaders as champions of South West Division 1.  The league system was 2 points for a win and 1 point for a draw with the league champions going straight up into National Division Two and the runners up playing a playoff against the runners up from National Division Three North for the final promotion place.

The season saw an incredibly tight title race between Blackheath and Launceston.  Both sides would finish dead level on 44 points each but Blackheath finished as champions thanks to a better for and against record.  Launceston would join the London side in the 2004–05 National Division Two, making an instant return by defeating 2003–04 National Division Three North runners up Halifax in their promotion playoff in what was a very tight game played at the Yorkshire-based club.  At the other end of the table the relegation battle was much less close with Old Colfeians and Basingstoke being the two sides to be relegated.  Both Old Colfeians and Basingstoke would be demoted to London Division 1 for the next season.

Participating teams and locations

Final league table

Results

Round 1

Round 2

Round 3

Round 4 

Postponed.  Game rescheduled to 21 February 2004.

Round 5

Round 6

Round 7

Round 8

Round 9

Round 10

Round 11

Round 12

Round 13

Round 14

Round 15

Round 16

Round 17

Round 18 

Postponed.  Game rescheduled to 21 February 2004.

Postponed.  Game rescheduled to 6 March 2004.

Round 19

Round 20

Rounds 4 & 18 (rescheduled games) 

Game rescheduled from 18 October 2003.

Game rescheduled from 31 January 2004.

Round 21 

Postponed.  Game rescheduled to 6 March 2004.

Rounds 18 & 21 (rescheduled games) 

Game rescheduled from 28 February 2004.

Game rescheduled from 31 January 2004.

Round 22

Round 23 

Postponed.  Game rescheduled to 27 March 2004.

Round 23 (rescheduled game) 

Game rescheduled from 20 March 2004.

Round 24

Round 25

Round 26

Promotion play-off
The league runners up of National Division Three South and North would meet in a playoff game for promotion to National Division Two.  Halifax were the northern divisions runners up and as they had a superior league record than southern runners-up, Launceston, they hosted the play-off match.

Total season attendances

Individual statistics 

 Note that points scorers includes tries as well as conversions, penalties and drop goals.

Top points scorers

Top try scorers

Season records

Team
Largest home win — 66 pts 
76 - 10 Westcombe Park at home to Dings Crusaders on 20 March 2004
Largest away win — 54 pts
60 - 6 Westcombe Park away to Basingstoke on 20 December 2003
Most points scored — 80 pts 
80 - 25 Launceston at home to Old Colfeians on 7 February 2004
Most tries in a match — 14
Rosslyn Park at home to Basingstoke on 11 January 2003
Most conversions in a match — 10
Launceston at home to Old Colfeians on 7 February 2004
Most penalties in a match — 6 (x2)
Blackheath away to Launceston on 22 November 2003
Blackheath away to Old Colfeians on 17 April 2004
Most drop goals in a match — 1
N/A - multiple teams

Player
Most points in a match — 35
 James O'Brien for Old Patesians at home to Old Colfeians on 27 March 2004
Most tries in a match — 7 
 James O'Brien for Old Patesians at home to Old Colfeians on 27 March 2004
Most conversions in a match — 10
 Simon Porter for Launceston at home to Old Colfeians on 7 February 2004
Most penalties in a match — 6 (x2)
 Derek Coates for Blackheath away to Launceston on 22 November 2003
 Derek Coates for Blackheath away to Old Colfeians on 17 April 2004
Most drop goals in a match — 1
N/A - multiple players

Attendances
Highest — N/A
N/A
Lowest — N/A
N/A
Highest Average Attendance — N/A 
N/A
Lowest Average Attendance — N/A
N/A

As only two attendances were listed due to poor media and club tracking it is therefore impossible to give any insight into attendances for this season.

See also
 English rugby union system
 Rugby union in England

References

External links
 NCA Rugby

2003-04
2003–04 in English rugby union leagues